Copley is an area of the town of Stalybridge, at the foot of the Pennines,  east of Manchester in Greater Manchester, England. The area has a local secondary school, Copley Academy, which is attached to a local recreational centre and swimming pool.

References

Areas of Greater Manchester
Geography of Tameside